Data (Greek: Δεδομένα, Dedomena) is a work by Euclid.  It deals with the nature and implications of "given" information in geometrical problems. The subject matter is closely related to the first four books of Euclid's Elements.

Editions and translations
Greek text
Data, ed. H. Menge, in Euclidis opera omnia, vol. 6, Leipzig: Teubner, 1896 (Google Books,  Wilbour Hall)
English versions
Translated by Robert Simson: 1821 edition, 1838 edition
The Data of Euclid, trans. from the text of Menge by George L. McDowell and Merle A. Sokolik, Baltimore: Union Square Press, 1993
The Medieval Latin Translation of the Data of Euclid, translated by Shuntaro Ito, Tokyo University Press, 1980 and Birkhauser, 1998.

Ancient Greek mathematical works
Works by Euclid